The Energy Act 1983 (1983  c. 25) is an Act of the Parliament of the United Kingdom which amended the law to facilitate the generation and supply of electricity other than by Electricity Boards. It also obliged Electricity Boards to adopt combined heat and power schemes. It gave statutory status to the Electricity Consumers' Council. The Act defined the duties of persons responsible for nuclear installations and penalties for a breach of those duties.

Background 
The Conservative government of the 1980s wished to stimulate the operation of market forces. The Energy Act was an attempt to realise this by encouraging competition in the electricity industry. As the Secretary of State for Energy, Nigel Lawson, stated in Parliament, the Energy Act ‘carries forward the Government's approach to the nationalised industries and the public sector generally. It is our aim, first, to stimulate the operation of market forces and to encourage competition; secondly, to remove artificial constraints on the private sector; thirdly, to open up the possibility for consumers of a choice of supplier; fourthly, to spur the massive State-owned corporations to greater efficiency; and, fifthly, further to diversify the country's sources of energy supply’. But he emphasised that the Act ‘is not concerned with the privatisation of the existing nationalised electricity supply industry’; that would come at the end of the decade. The Act also encouraged the development of industrial combined heat and power schemes.

Energy Act 1983 
The Energy Act 1983 (1983  c. 25) received Royal Assent on 9 May 1983. Its long title is ‘An Act to amend the law relating to electricity so as to facilitate the generation and supply of electricity by persons other than Electricity Boards, and for certain other purposes; and to amend the law relating to the duties of persons responsible for nuclear installations and to compensation for breach of those duties’.

Provisions 
The Act comprises 38 Sections in 3 Parts and 4 Schedules

PART I Electricity

Private generation and supply

 Section 1  Removal of restrictions on supply etc.
 Section 2  Notice of construction or extension of generating stations
 Section 3  Nuclear-powered generating stations
 Section 4  Hydro-electric generating stations in Scotland
 Section 5  Private generators and Electricity Boards
 Section 6  Charges for supplies by Electricity Boards
 Section 7  Charges for purchases by Electricity Boards
 Section 8  Charges for use of transmission and distribution systems
 Section 9  Disputes as to offers under section 5 etc.
 Section 10  Further provisions as to charges under sections 7 and 8
 Section 11 Arrangements between Electricity Boards
 Section 12  Meters to be of approved pattern
 Section 13  Duty of Boards to supply
 Section 14  Inspection and testing of lines etc.

Miscellaneous and general

 Section 15  Amendments relating to meters
 Section 16  Regulations relating to supply and safety
 Section 17  Charges for availability of supply
 Section 18  Purchases by Electricity Boards from local authorities
 Section 19 Combined heat and power
 Section 20  Abolition of rights of entry
 Section 21  The Electricity Consumers' Council
 Section 22  Functions of other bodies in relation to Electricity Consumers' Council
 Section 23  Offences
 Section 24  Regulations: general
 Section 25  Amendments
 Section 26  Interpretation of Part I

PART II Nuclear Installations

 Section 27  Limitation of operators' liability
 Section 28  General cover for compensation
 Section 29  Carriage of nuclear matter
 Section 30  Provisions supplementary to sections 27 to 29
 Section 31  Reciprocal enforcement of judgments
 Section 32  Meaning of "excepted matter"
 Section 33  Extension to territories outside United Kingdom
 Section 34  United Kingdom Atomic Energy Authority

PART III General

 Section 35  Financial provisions
 Section 36  Repeals
 Section 37  Commencement
 Section 38  Short title and extent

Schedules

 Schedule 1 Electricity : Amendments Relating to Meters
 Schedule 2  The Electricity Consumers' Council
 Schedule 3  Electricity : Minor and Consequential Amendments
 Schedule 4  Enactments Repealed

Effects and consequences 
The purpose of the Part I of the Act was to promote competition in the domestic electricity market by encouraging private generation and supply. It entitled private generators of electricity to sell their electricity to the local electricity board. It thereby gave them a guaranteed market. It also allowed them to use the public transmission and distribution system.

The Oil and Gas (Enterprise) Act 1982 had opened up the public gas supply system to competition from the private sector. The pipelines of the British Gas Corporation were used to transmit and distribute other suppliers' gas. The Energy Act 1983 extended this approach into the supply of electricity. It was recognised that the Energy Act 1983 did not have a significant effect. It did not lead to an increase in private power generation. However, it did set the scene for more radical reforms at the end of the 1980s including the privatisation of the electricity industry implemented from 1989.

Part II of the Act updated the Nuclear Installations (Amendment) Act 1965, which had subsequently been consolidated into the Nuclear Installations Act 1965. Over the years the penalties prescribed by the Acts had lost much of their value through inflation. The purpose of the 1983 Act was to restore the real value of the amounts of compensation that the 1965 Act provides for damage caused by nuclear incidents.

Part III of the Act repealed the whole of the Electric Lighting Act 1888 (51 & 52 Vict. c. 12) and amended certain sections of the Electric Lighting (Clauses) Act 1899 (62 & 63 Vict. c. 19).

Subsequent legislation 
Sections 1 to 26 of the Energy Act 1983 were repealed by the Electricity Act 1989.

Schedules 1 to 3 of the Energy Act 1983 were repealed by the Electricity Act 1989.

See also 

 Oil and Gas (Enterprise) Act 1982
 Electricity Act 1989
 Timeline of the UK electricity supply industry

References 

United Kingdom Acts of Parliament 1983
Electric power in the United Kingdom